William Frederick Albury (born 10 August 1933) was an English professional footballer. He played professionally for Portsmouth and Gillingham between 1951 and 1960, and in total made 61 appearances in the English Football League, scoring 12 goals. He later played in the Southern League for Yeovil Town and in the Hampshire League for Waterlooville.

References

1933 births
Living people
English footballers
Gillingham F.C. players
Portsmouth F.C. players
Waterlooville F.C. players
Yeovil Town F.C. players
Footballers from Portsmouth
English Football League players
Association football wing halves